Abaclia is a village in Basarabeasca District, Moldova.

Notable people 
 Iurie Reniță, Moldovan Ambassador to Romania

References

Villages of Basarabeasca District
Bendersky Uyezd